Ischnura senegalensis, also known variously as common bluetail, marsh bluetail, ubiquitous bluetail, African bluetail, and Senegal golden dartlet, is a widespread damselfly of the family Coenagrionidae. It is native from Africa, through the Middle East, to southern and eastern Asia.

Description and habitat
It is a small damselfly with black capped bluish green eyes. Its thorax is black on dorsum and greenish blue on the sides. Its abdomen is black on dorsum up to segment 7. Segments 1 and 2 are greenish blue and 3 to 7 are khaki yellow on the sides. Segments 8 and 9 are azure blue, with 9 black on dorsum. Segment 10 is black on dorsum and khaki yellow on the sides. The green on thorax and abdomen may turn to blue in both male and female when aged. 

The females of this species exhibit sexual mimicry. One group mimics the males’ colour (androchromes). Other group will have their own female colouration (gynochromes). Androchrom female looks exactly like the male except in sexual characteristics. In gynochrome, the eyes are olive green with orange above. Sides of the thorax is mud colored, will pale when matured. All the abdominal segments are marked with black on dorsum. The lateral sides are khaki yellow. Segments 1-2 and 8-10 have orage color laterally, will fade when matured.
 
It breeds in marshes, weedy ponds and wetlands.

See also 
 List of odonates of India
 List of odonates of Sri Lanka
 List of odonata of Kerala

References

External links
Ischnura senegalensis photos
Notes on dragonflies in Egypt

Ischnura
Odonata of Africa
Insects described in 1842
Taxa named by Jules Pierre Rambur